Cass City Jr./Sr. High School is a public middle school and high school located in Cass City, Michigan, United States.

History
The school has served grades 9 to 12 since its construction in 1967, and additionally grades 7 to 8 since 2013.

Extracurricular activities
Cass City Jr./Sr. High School offers a variety of extracurricular activities. These include several sports, such as football, wrestling, basketball, baseball, volleyball, as well as marching and concert band, drama club, and yearbook.

The Cass City Red Hawks wrestling team won three out of four district titles from 2009 to 2012. The girls' cross country team has taken multiple league titles as well has regional titles. The JV football team was undefeated in the 2011 season.

References

External links
 
 School profile at publicschoolreview.com

Public high schools in Michigan
Educational institutions established in 1967
Schools in Tuscola County, Michigan
1967 establishments in Michigan